X-linked interleukin-1 receptor accessory protein-like 2 is a protein that in humans is encoded by the IL1RAPL2 gene.

The protein encoded by this gene is a member of the interleukin 1 receptor family. This protein is similar to the interleukin 1 accessory proteins, and is most closely related to interleukin 1 receptor accessory protein-like 1 (IL1RAPL1). This gene and IL1RAPL1 are located at a region on chromosome X that is associated with X-linked non-syndromic mental retardation.

References

Further reading